Raffaele Piras (26 August 1942 – 4 December 2014) was an Italian long jumper.

Achievements

Career
Two-time national champion at senior level in long jump in 1961 and 1963.

References

External links
 Raffaele Piras
 Scomparso Raffaele Piras, atletica ancora in lutto

1942 births
2014 deaths
Italian male long jumpers
Athletics competitors of Centro Sportivo Carabinieri